Nikolay Marincheshki (born 18 September 1957) is a Bulgarian fencer. He competed in the team sabre event at the 1980 Summer Olympics and the individual and team sabre events at the 1988 Summer Olympics.

References

1957 births
Living people
Bulgarian male sabre fencers
Olympic fencers of Bulgaria
Fencers at the 1980 Summer Olympics
Fencers at the 1988 Summer Olympics
Sportspeople from Plovdiv